Rayshaun Kizer (born February 3, 1985) is the Head Coach for the Omaha Beef of the Champions Indoor Football.  He was the former Head Coach and Defensive Coordinator of the Massachusetts Pirates of the Indoor Football League.  He is also a former National Football League, Canadian Football League, and Arena Football League Defensive Back. He played his college football at Walsh University and graduated with his bachelor's degree in Computer Science. He has been a member of the New York Jets of the National Football League, Montreal Alouettes and Hamilton Tiger-Cats of the Canadian Football League, Orlando Predators, Philadelphia Soul, Arizona Rattlers, New Orleans VooDoo, Los Angeles KISS and Cleveland Gladiators of the Arena Football League and Green Bay Blizzard of the Arena Football 2. He also served as the Assistant Head Coach, Defensive Coordinator and Special Teams Coach of the Bismarck Bucks of the Indoor Football League.

Early years and college career
Kizer attended Euclid High School in Euclid, Ohio.

He played for the Walsh University Cavaliers from 2003 to 2006. He recorded 14 interceptions for the Cavaliers, returning 5 for touchdowns. He was named First Team All-American and First Team All-Conference his senior year.  He was also named Second team All-Conference as a junior and First team All-Conference as a sophomore. He was inducted into the school's Wall of Fame as part of the class of 2015.

Professional career

New York Jets
Kizer signed with the New York Jets on May 15, 2007, after going undrafted in the 2007 NFL Draft. He was released by the Jets on August 27, 2007.

Montreal Alouettes
Kizer was signed by the Montreal Alouettes on September 11, 2007. He was released by the Alouettes on October 7, 2008.

Green Bay Blizzard
Kizer played for the Green Bay Blizzard of the af2 during the 2009 season. He played in 17 games for the Blizzard, recording 65 tackles, 4 interceptions, 15 pass break-ups, one forced fumble, and 2 fumble recoveries. He was awarded Defensive Player of the Week honors in the American Conference Finals Game after sealing the victory with a game-ending interception.

Orlando Predators
Kizer played for the Orlando Predators from 2010 to 2011. He led the Arena Football League in interceptions with 12 his rookie year in 2010, earning First Team All-Arena honors. He set a new AFL record when he recorded 16 interceptions during the 2011 season. Kizer was also named First Team All-Arena for the second consecutive year.

Montreal Alouettes
Kizer was signed to the practice squad of the Montreal Alouettes on September 27, 2011. He was released by the Alouettes on October 6, 2011.

Hamilton Tiger-Cats
Kizer was signed to the practice squad of the Hamilton Tiger-Cats on October 15, 2011. He was released by the Tiger-Cats on November 2, 2011.

Philadelphia Soul
 Kizer signed with the Philadelphia Soul on November 22, 2011. He earned Second Team All-Arena honors after recording 82 tackles and nine interceptions in 18 games with the Soul in 2013. He was named Second Team All-Arena for the second consecutive year after collecting 101.5 tackles and nine interceptions in 18 games in 2014.

Arizona Rattlers
On January 7, 2015, Kizer was assigned to the Arizona Rattlers.

New Orleans VooDoo
On March 23, 2015, Kizer, was traded to the New Orleans VooDoo in exchange for future considerations.

Los Angeles KISS
On May 25, 2015, Kizer was traded to the Los Angeles KISS for future considerations. He earned Second Team All-Arena honors for the third consecutive year after recording 87.5 tackles and five interceptions in 2015. He became a free agent after the 2015 season. On November 6, 2015, Kizer was assigned to the KISS for the 2016 season.  Kizer suffered a season ending ankle injury that kept him out for most of the 2016 season.

Qingdao Clipper
Kizer was selected by the Qingdao Clipper in the fourth round of the 2016 CAFL Draft.

Cleveland Gladiators
On January 9, 2017, Kizer was assigned to the Cleveland Gladiators.

Georgia Doom
In March 2018, Kizer was assigned to the Georgia Doom.

Bismarck Bucks
In January 2019, Kizer was assigned to the Bismarck Bucks of the Indoor Football League as the Assistant Head Coach, Defensive Coordinator and Special Teams Coach.

Massachusetts Pirates
In March 2020, Kizer was assigned to the Massachusetts Pirates of the Indoor Football League as the Defensive Coordinator. Due to COVID in 2020 the Massachusetts Pirates season was cancelled. Following the next season in 2021, Kizer returned to the Massachusetts Pirates as the Assistant Head Coach and Defensive Coordinator.  They then went on and win the 2021 IFL United Bowl Championship under strong leadership of Assistant Head Coach Kizer. Winners of 11 straight games that season and Kizer was the only Assistant Coach to receive votes for coach of the year.  He also had the #1 Defense in the league that season keeping opponents under 31 points per game.  In January 2022, Kizer was promoted to Head Coach of the Massachusetts Pirates. He had a successful first season as a Head Coach with an 11–5 record but unfortunately lost the first round of the playoffs at home against the  United Bowl Contenders Quad City Steamwheelers.

Omaha Beef
In January 2022, Kizer was assigned to the Omaha Beef of the Champions Indoor Football as the Head Coach.

References

External links
Just Sports Stats
AFL Leaders in Interceptions for a season
AFL Leaders for career Interceptions
AFL Leaders in Interceptions for TDs
Kizer 2022 Head Coaching Interview

Living people
1985 births
American football defensive backs
Canadian football defensive backs
African-American players of American football
African-American players of Canadian football
Walsh Cavaliers football players
New York Jets players
Montreal Alouettes players
Green Bay Blizzard players
Orlando Predators players
Philadelphia Soul players
Arizona Rattlers players
New Orleans VooDoo players
Los Angeles Kiss players
Cleveland Gladiators players
Qingdao Clipper players
Players of American football from Ohio
People from Euclid, Ohio